This is a list of annual Daytime Emmy Award winners for Best Drama Series and Best Lead Actress/Actor, Supporting Actress/Actor and Younger Actress/Actor in a Drama Series.

1974-2019

2020-present 
The categories, Outstanding Younger Actor and Younger Actress were merged into Outstanding Younger Performer in a Drama Series.

References

Daytime Emmy Awards